Kulfal can refer to:

 Kulfal, Ayvacık
 Kulfal, Çan